Cameron is a city in Marshall County, West Virginia, United States. It is part of the Wheeling, West Virginia metropolitan area. The population was 849 at the 2020 census.

Geography
Cameron is located at  (39.826579, -80.566107).

Demographics

2010 census
At the 2010 census there were 946 people, 400 households, and 258 families living in the city. The racial makeup of the city was 98.6% White, 0.2% African American, 0.4% Asian, and 0.7% from two or more races. Hispanic or Latino of any race were 0.6%.

Of the 400 households 33.0% had children under the age of 18 living with them, 41.3% were married couples living together, 17.0% had a female householder with no husband present, 6.3% had a male householder with no wife present, and 35.5% were non-families. 31.5% of households were one person and 15.8% were one person aged 65 or older. The average household size was 2.37 and the average family size was 2.90.

The median age was 39.4 years. 24.4% of residents were under the age of 18; 8.1% were between the ages of 18 and 24; 24.9% were from 25 to 44; 26.5% were from 45 to 64; and 16.1% were 65 or older. The gender makeup of the city was 46.7% male and 53.3% female.

2000 census
At the 2000 census there were 1,212 people, 478 households, and 305 families living in the city. The population density was 1,357.9 people per square mile (525.8/km). There were 533 housing units at an average density of 597.2 per square mile (231.2/km).  The racial makeup of the city was 98.93% White, 0.17% African American, 0.08% Native American, 0.08% from other races, and (0.74% from two or more races. Hispanic or Latino of any race were 0.25%.

Of the 478 households 27.6% had children under the age of 18 living with them, 45.6% were married couples living together, 13.8% had a female householder with no husband present, and 36.0% were non-families. 31.0% of households were one person and 20.1% were one person aged 65 or older. The average household size was 2.41 and the average family size was 2.99.

The age distribution was 24.0% under the age of 18, 8.7% from 18 to 24, 23.4% from 25 to 44, 21.0% from 45 to 64, and 22.9% 65 or older. The median age was 41 years. For every 100 females, there were 85.0 males. For every 100 females age 18 and over, there were 77.1 males.

The median household income was $25,119 and the median family income  was $26,958. Males had a median income of $31,875 versus $14,438 for females. The per capita income for the city was $11,447. About 26.9% of families and 30.6% of the population were below the poverty line, including 44.4% of those under age 18 and 14.1% of those age 65 or over.

History and culture
The town has the name of Samuel Cameron, a railroad worker.

Cameron's historical beach-style swimming pool, known as Cameron City Pool-PWA Project 1196, is one of a few in the entire nation.  Cameron was a Socialist Party of America stronghold in the early 1900s. Cameron Downtown is a national historic district listed on the National Register of Historic Places in 1998. The Spencer Cemetery was added in 2012.

References

Cities in West Virginia
Cities in Marshall County, West Virginia